Swimming at the 1996 Summer Paralympics consisted of 168 events, 87 for men and 81 for women. Because of a tie in the men's 100 m freestyle S4 event, a total of 169 bronze medals were awarded.

The 1996 Summer Paralympics in Atlanta were the first ones where swimming was fully integrated based on functional disability, with classification no longer separated into classes based on the four disability types of vision impaired, cerebral palsy, amputee, and wheelchair sport.  Countries no longer had multiple national swimming teams based on disability type but instead had one mixed disability national team.

Medal table

Participating nations

Medal summary

Men's events

Women's events

See also
Swimming at the 1996 Summer Olympics

References 

 

 
1996 Summer Paralympics events
1996
Paralympics
1996 Summer Olympics
1996 Summer Olympics events